Randwick may refer to:

Australia
Randwick, New South Wales, a suburb of Sydney
City of Randwick, a local-government area in Sydney
Randwick Racecourse
Randwick DRUFC, a rugby-union club in Randwick, New South Wales

New Zealand 
 Randwick Kingfishers, a rugby-league club based in Lower Hutt

United Kingdom
Randwick, Gloucestershire, a village